AWSS can refer to:

 Automated Weather Sensor System
 San Francisco Fire Department Auxiliary Water Supply System